Collepepe is a  of the  of Collazzone in the Province of Perugia, Umbria, central Italy. It stands at an elevation of 251 metres above sea level. At the time of the Istat census of 2001 it had 917 inhabitants.

The historic old town is located inside city walls. It contains the Romanesque-Gothic stone church of Santa Maria Assunta.

References 

Frazioni of the Province of Perugia